The Melody Lingers On may refer to:
 The Melody Lingers On (Dizzy Gillespie album)
 The Melody Lingers On (Houston Person album)
 The Melody Lingers On (Etta Jones album)
 The Melody Lingers On (film), a 1935 American film